No Culture is the sixth album by Vancouver-based indie rock band Mother Mother, released on February 10, 2017. It was produced by Ryan Guldemond, Brian Howes and Jason Van Poederooyen.

Track listing

Personnel
Molly Guldemond – vocals and keyboard
Ryan Guldemond – guitar and vocals
Jasmin Parkin – keyboard and vocals
Ali Siadat – drums
Mike Young – bass

Charts

References

2017 albums
Albums recorded at The Warehouse Studio
Mother Mother albums